The Meeting International de Nice "Nikaïa was an annual one-day outdoor track and field meeting at the Stade Charles-Ehrmann in Nice, France. First held on 16 August 1976, it was held in June or July each year until 2001, when the meeting folded due to financial reasons. It was part of the IAAF Grand Prix circuit from 1998 to 2001.

References

Defunct athletics competitions
Athletics competitions in France
Sport in Nice
IAAF Grand Prix
Recurring sporting events established in 1976
Recurring sporting events disestablished in 2001
1976 establishments in France
2001 disestablishments in France
Defunct sports competitions in France